Acacia merrallii, commonly known as Merrall's wattle, is a shrub belonging to the genus Acacia and the subgenus Phyllodineae that is endemic to south western and southern Australia.

Description
The branchlets are often covered in minutely fine, straight or barely curved hairs. Like most species of Acacia it has phyllodes rather than true leaves. The thick, smooth, grey-green phyllodes have an obliquely obovate to oblong-elliptic shape and is occasionally ovate. It blooms from August to October and produces yellow flowers. The dark brown to black coloured glabrous pods are thinly coriaceous-crustaceous.

Taxonomy
The species was first formally described by the botanist Ferdinand von Mueller in 1890 as part of the work Descriptions of hitherto unrecorded Australian plants, with additional phyto-geographic notes as published in the Proceedings of the Linnean Society of New South Wales. It was reclassified as Racosperma merrallii in 2003 by Leslie Pedley then transferred back to genus Acacia in 2006. The only other synonyms are Acacia merrallii var. merrallii and Acacia dubia.

Distribution
In Western Australia it is native to an area in the Goldfields-Esperance and Wheatbelt regions of Western Australia where it is commonly situated on plains, low-lying areas and around salt lakes where it grows in sandy clay, sandy, loamy, calcareous or lateritic soils. In Western Australia the range of the shrub extends from around Wubin in the north west to around Pingrup in the south west extending out to around Madura in the east. It is also found in South Australia along coastal areas of the Nullarbor Plain to around Moonta in the north east and Maitland in the south east on the Yorke Peninsula.

Cultivation
The shrub is available commercially where it can be planted as an ornamental plant suitable for low maintenance areas where it can be employed as an understorey shrub in mixed plantings and along roadside verges or on median strips as a wind-break, natural barrier or erosion control. It can be planted close to the coast line or in hills or on plains in full sun or part shade and can tolerate drought and moderate frosts. It is both bird and insect attracting.

See also
List of Acacia species

References

merrallii
Acacias of Western Australia
Taxa named by Ferdinand von Mueller
Flora of South Australia
Plants described in 1890